David Bryan Rashbaum (born February 7, 1962) is an American musician and songwriter, best known as the keyboard player for the rock band Bon Jovi, with which he also co-wrote songs and performed backing vocals. In 2018, Bryan was inducted into the Rock and Roll Hall of Fame as a member of Bon Jovi. He is also known for writing the music and co-writing the lyrics with Joe DiPietro for the musical Memphis, for which he won the Tony Award for Best Original Score.

Early life
David Bryan Rashbaum was born on February 7, 1962, in Perth Amboy, New Jersey and raised in Edison, New Jersey. His father, Eddie Rashbaum, played the trumpet. Bryan was raised Jewish. He attended elementary school at Clara Barton, where he played many instruments including violin, viola, trumpet and clarinet. He also attended Herbert Hoover Middle School, then J. P. Stevens High School, from which he graduated. Bryan began to learn piano at age seven and played keyboards for a band called Transition with bass player Steve Sileo and lead singer Mike Ziegel. He studied with Emery Hack, a professor at Juilliard, for thirteen years. Bryan briefly attended Rutgers University, but dropped out to attend Juilliard.

Career

With Bon Jovi

Bryan was the first Bon Jovi member to receive a call when Jon Bon Jovi learned that he had received a recording contract, and agreed to join the band. He chose his stage name when he grew tired of continually having to spell out his entire name. At the time, Bryan was attending Rutgers University and was studying Pre-Med with a 4.0 GPA. Bryan has played keyboards and sung on all of Bon Jovi's albums, as well as some of the solo albums of Jon Bon Jovi and Richie Sambora. Bryan has co-written the songs "Love Lies" and "Breakout" on Bon Jovi's self-titled first album; "Only Lonely," "The Hardest Part Is the Night," and "To the Fire" on 7800° Fahrenheit; the hit "In These Arms" on Keep the Faith; and "Last Cigarette" on Have a Nice Day (including the international bonus track "Unbreakable") .

Musical theater
Bryan and Joe DiPietro wrote the music for the musical Memphis, for which the duo won the Tony Award for Best Original Score The musical had its off-Broadway debut in 2002. In 2008, Memphis was performed at the La Jolla Playhouse in San Diego. The show was also performed in January 2009 in Seattle, Washington, at the 5th Avenue Theatre, prior to moving to Broadway later in 2009. Memphis, which ran on Broadway from October 18, 2009 to August 5, 2012, was nominated for 8 Tony awards for the 2010 season and won 4 including Best Musical and Best Original Score.

Bryan also co-wrote the musical The Toxic Avenger, again collaborating with Joe DiPietro. The musical made its off-Broadway premiere at New World Stages on April 6, 2009.

He has worked on a musical with DiPietro titled Chasing the Song, which chronicles American songwriters from 1962 to 1964 who worked in the Brill Building. Bryan describes it as "It's a fictional story about factual America." Director Christopher Ashley and choreographer Sergio Trujillo are also involved. According to Playbill, "A fall or early winter workshop of the musical is currently being planned. Broadway is the goal."

Their musical Diana, about Princess Diana, began previews on Broadway on March 2, 2020 with an anticipated opening date of March 31, following a tryout production at the La Jolla Playhouse in San Diego, CA the previous year. The Broadway opening was delayed until December 16, 2021 due to the COVID-19 pandemic closing of all Broadway theaters. The musical was then filmed that summer with no audience at the Longacre Theater, with the film being released on Netflix on October 1, 2021.

Personal life
Bryan married his high school sweetheart April McLean on August 25, 1990, but they divorced in 2004. They have three children. Bryan married Lexi Quaas on August 7, 2010, in Colts Neck, New Jersey.

In the late 1990s, prior to Bon Jovi coming together to record Crush, Bryan nearly severed his finger in a home accident involving a circular saw. After a year of rehabilitation, Bryan regained use of his finger and returned to playing the keyboard. In 1991, before he helped Bon Jovi guitarist Richie Sambora in his solo album Stranger in This Town and record a soundtrack in the horror movie Netherworld, Bryan was suffering from a South American parasite, caught during a tour with the band. Bryan was hospitalized. He described his condition: "It ate out my stomach lining, my intestines, and attacked my nerve endings. It was in my bloodstream; I was poisoned. I was 145 pounds, and I was really ill in the hospital for two weeks... then bedridden at home, for a month".

On March 21, 2020, Bryan announced that he had tested positive for COVID-19 amidst the COVID-19 pandemic. On April 19, 2020, a month after the diagnosis, Bryan announced that he recovered from COVID-19.

Charity work
Bryan is very active in VH-1's Save the Music program, as well as Only Make Believe. He also wrote the anthem for Only Make Believe, "Rockin' All Over the World", with Dena Hammerstein. He is an honorary Board member for Only Make Believe, a non-profit organization that brings interactive theatre to chronically ill and disabled children in hospitals and care facilities. He is also a board member of Damon Marks' Traveling Guitar Foundation.

The band has built several homes for victims of Hurricane Katrina. The video for the hit song "Who Says You Can't Go Home" is a documentary of the making of these homes. The band also gave Oprah Winfrey's Angel Network one million dollars. With this, she created Bon Jovi Boulevard in Louisiana. Bon Jovi was welcomed back, one year later, to see Bon Jovi Boulevard, and to unveil it to its future residents.

Discography

Solo
 Netherworld soundtrack (1992)
 On a Full Moon (1995)
 Lunar Eclipse (2000)

With Bon Jovi

Studio albums

Bon Jovi (1984)
7800° Fahrenheit (1985)
Slippery When Wet (1986)
New Jersey (1988)
Keep the Faith (1992)
These Days (1995)
Crush (2000)
Bounce (2002)
Have a Nice Day (2005)
Lost Highway (2007)
The Circle (2009)
What About Now (2013)
Burning Bridges (2015)
This House Is Not for Sale (2016)
2020 (2020)

Compilation albums

Hard & Hot (1991)
Cross Road (1994)
Tokyo Road: Best of Bon Jovi (2001)
This Left Feels Right (2003)
Greatest Hits (2010)

Live albums
One Wild Night Live 1985-2001 (2001)
Inside Out (2012)
This House Is Not for Sale – Live from the London Palladium (2016)

Box sets
100,000,000 Bon Jovi Fans Can't Be Wrong (2004)

Contributions
Stranger in This Town (1991) – songwriter, keyboards, string arrangements
Netherworld Soundtrack (1992) – original score
Time Was – Curtis Stigers (1995) – wrote "This Time"
Destination Anywhere (1997) – accordion, piano
Undiscovered Soul (1998) – songwriter
The Toxic Avenger (2009) – musical soundtrack
Memphis: A New Musical (2009) – musical soundtrack
Memphis: The Musical (2015) – musical soundtrack
 My Everything Is You – Brotherhood (studio album)| Matt O'Ree Band – (2016) – songwriter, performer
 My Everything Is You – Live at the Stone Pony! (live album)| Matt O'Ree Band – (2018) – songwriter, performer
Diana: The Musical (2019) – musical soundtrack

Further reading
 Larkin, Colin. The Guinness Encyclopedia of Popular Music, Guinness Publishing, 1992.

References

External links

1962 births
20th-century American keyboardists
21st-century American keyboardists
21st-century organists
American heavy metal keyboardists
American male organists
American male pianists
American rock keyboardists
American rock pianists
Bon Jovi members
Broadway composers and lyricists
J. P. Stevens High School alumni
Jersey Shore musicians
Jewish American musicians
Jewish American songwriters
Jewish heavy metal musicians
Juilliard School alumni
Living people
Musicians from Edison, New Jersey
People from Edison, New Jersey
People from Perth Amboy, New Jersey
Rutgers University alumni
Songwriters from New Jersey
Tony Award winners